Nina Liu (born 15 June 1977) is an Australian actress of Chinese descent. Her most prominent role was as Chloe in the television series The Secret Life of Us. 

She also starred in the series Heartbreak High during its 5th season, the series Something in the Air as Dr Annie Young and in Shaun Micallef's legal-comedy Welcher & Welcher as Tia the receptionist.

More recently, she has had roles in the Australian films Little Fish (2005) and The Book of Revelation (2006) and she appeared in the docu-drama Super Comet: After the Impact which aired on the Discovery Channel in 2007.

External links 
 

1977 births
Australian television actresses
Living people
Australian people of Chinese descent
21st-century Australian actresses
Actresses from Sydney
Australian actresses of Chinese descent